The KP500 (marketed as LG Cookie, or Cooky in South Korea) is a touchscreen mobile phone. LG targeted the entry-level touchscreen market keeping the cost of the Cookie as low as possible by omitting some of the features found on high-end products like LG Renoir, such as GPS, 3G or Wi-Fi. It was announced on 30 September 2008.

The LG Cookie became highly popular in the market. It recorded over two million unit sales worldwide in the first five months after its launch in December 2008. It sold 1.2 million units in Europe, 600,000 in Asia and emerging markets, and 100,000 in Korea, where LG claimed that it was the most popular handset as of March 2009. LG planned to expand the Cookie’s availability from 40 to 60 countries as part of its push to hit 13 million in sales worldwide.

The phone was originally released in four colors: Black, Vandyke Brown, Anodizing Silver, and Elegant Gold. This was later increased to ten colors including white, pink and purple. 

Its main feature is a 3-inch, 240 x 400 pixel touchscreen, powered by an ARM9E CPU with a clock rate of 175 MHz. It has a 3.15 MP camera capable of capturing still images and MPEG-4 video capture at 12 frame/s, but has no flash module. The LG KP500 Cookie also has an FM radio receiver with RDS and an accelerometer motion sensor with support for auto-rotating display. Software installed on the handset included a document viewer for DOC, XLS, and PDF formats, and a Java MIDP 2.0 games player. The battery is capable of standby time of up to 350 hours and talk time of up to 3 hours 30 minutes.

Other revisions carrying the Cookie name would also be later released: Cookie Fresh, Cookie Lite, Cookie Style, Cookie WiFi, Cookie Gig, Cookie 3G and Cookie Plus all in 2010; Cookie Tweet with a QWERTY keyboard, and Cookie Duo in 2011; and Cookie Smart in 2012. The LG Cookie's successor, LG Pop, was introduced in late 2009.

Their rivals are Samsung Tocco as well as cheaper and functionally-reduced version, Samsung Tocco Lite as well as the world's first Android phone, HTC Dream and touchscreen Symbian phones, Nokia 5800 XpressMusic and Nokia 5530 XpressMusic

See also
LG Chocolate Touch (VX8575)
LG New Chocolate (BL40)
LG Crystal (GD900)

References

External links 
 Official LG KP500 website
 Stress test of a cell phone LG KP500
 Unofficial LG KP500 Support Forum
 LG KP500 Wallpapers Download Link
 Sample photos of the LG KP500 with detailed Exif-data

KP500
Mobile phones introduced in 2008